Sven Apel (born 1977) is a German computer scientist and professor of software engineering at Saarland University.

His research focuses on software product lines and configurable systems, domain-specific generation and optimization, software analytics and intelligence, as well as empirical methods and the human factor in software development.

Education and career 
Sven Apel studied computer science at the University of Magdeburg from 1996 to 2002. At the same university, he also received his doctorate in computer science in 2007 with a thesis on the “Role of Features and Aspects in Software Development.”

After his doctorate, Apel was a postdoctoral researcher at the University of Passau until 2010. From 2010 to 2013, he led the Emmy Noether Junior Research Group “Secure and Efficient Software Product Lines” there before he was appointed professor in Passau in 2013 as part of the DFG's Heisenberg Program.

Since 2019, Sven Apel has been a professor of software engineering at Saarland University.

In 2019, Apel, together with Christian Kästner and Martin Kuhlemann, received the “Most Influential Paper Award” at the Systems and Software Products Line Conference (SPLC) for the paper “Granularity in Software Product Lines”. In the article, the three researchers demonstrate how programs can be extended by fine-grained import from other software.

In 2022, together with Janet Feigenspan, Christian Kästner, Jörg Liebig and Stefan Hanenberg, he was awarded the “Most Influential Paper Award” at the International Conference on Program Comprehension (ICPC) for the paper “Measuring programming experience”. In the article, the researchers present a questionnaire and an experiment to assess and measure a programmer's level of experience.

According to Google Scholar, he has an h-index of 69.

Research areas 
Sven Apel's research focuses in particular on methods, tools, and theories for the construction of manageable, reliable, efficient, configurable, and evolvable software systems.

In addition to the technical aspects, the human and social factors in software development also play an important role for him. For example, he investigates program comprehension with the help of neurophysiological measurements, such as functional magnetic resonance imaging (fMRI).

Awards 

 2007: Ernst Denert Software Engineering Prize
 2013: Heisenberg Professorship with focus on software development, in particular automatic software construction
 2015: Member of the Young Academy of Europe
 2016: Hugo Junkers Award for Research and Innovation from Saxony-Anhalt
 2018: ACM Distinguished Member for outstanding scientific contributions to computing
 2019: “Most Influential Paper Award” of the Systems and Software Products Line Conference (SPLC)
 2022: “Most Influential Paper Award” of the International Conference on Program Comprehension (ICPC)
 2022: ERC Advanced Grant “Brains on Code”

References

External links 
 Website of Professor Apel

Academic staff of Saarland University
1977 births
German computer scientists
Distinguished Members of the ACM

Living people